Dukhovnitskoye is an urban locality (a work settlement) and the administrative center of Dukhovnitsky District in Saratov Oblast, Russia, located on the Volga River. Population:

References

Urban-type settlements in Saratov Oblast